Yosef Yitzchak "Yossi" Jacobson (born June 11, 1972), also known as YY Jacobson, is an American Chabad rabbi and speaker from Monsey, New York.

Early life and career 

Yosef Yitzchak Jacobson was born on June 11, 1972 in Crown Heights, Brooklyn and grew up there as part of a Chabad Hasidic family. He started his studies in Oholei Torah, after which he moved to study in Chabad's Central Tomchei Temimim Yeshiva of 770 Eastern Parkway. 

In 1990, at the age of 17, Yosef Yitzchak was recruited by his brother Simon to join the team that prepared the public addresses of Menachem Mendel Schneerson for publication. Not being able to use recording devices because of Shabbat and Jewish Holidays observance, they were charged with memorizing talks, lasting many hours. After Shabbat or the Jewish Holidays he would get together with the rest of the team to transcribe those public addresses. 

As a senior fellow, Jacobson taught Talmud, Kabbalah, and Hasidic philosophy at Chabad Lubavitch Rabbinical Seminary Chovevei Torah.

Jacobson was initially tested on his semikhah (rabbinic ordination) by Pinhas Hirschprung as well as by Zalman Labkowsky. Having to still complete a last part of his test, Jacobson returned to 770 in 2011 to get tested and receive his rabbinical ordination through Labkowsky.

In 2005, Jacobson followed in the footsteps of his late father Gershon Jacobson as editor-in-chief of the Yiddish weekly Algemeiner Journal, which he contributed to for a number of years. He was a mashpia (spiritual mentor) at the Chovevei Torah Yeshiva in Crown Heights, Brooklyn, and a teacher at the Ohr Chaim Learning Center in Monsey, New York.

Talks 
Jacobson holds public talks on many subjects. Some noted talks included:

 The role of religious leaders in today's world.
 The Rebbe and the Rav.
Spiritual Leadership in Persistent Conflict
 2008 keynote address at the annual US military Chief of Chaplains Senior Leadership Training Conference, as the first rabbi to give this keynote

Works 
Jacobson authored the following series

 "A Tale of Two Souls" on the Tanya
 "A Journey Through the fundamentals of chassidus" in conjunction with Mayan Yisroel of Flatbush
 Emunah Series
 Captain, My Captain

Personal life 
Jacobson lives with his family in Monsey. His siblings are author Simon Jacobson,  Boruch Jacobson—a Chabad shliach at Hunter College, Freida Hecht of Norwalk, Connecticut and Chana Krasnianski of Manhattan.

References

External links 
 TheYeshiva.net

1972 births
Jewish American writers
21st-century American rabbis
Living people
Chabad-Lubavitch rabbis
American Hasidic rabbis
People from Rockland County, New York
Rabbis from New York (state)